Made in India is a television show hosted by Nasirr Khan about inventions and contributions by India to the world. It airs every Monday at 10:30 PM on Epic (TV channel).It has completed 4 episodes as on 16 December 2014.

Episodes

Episode 1 

Sushruta

It is 600 years B.C.E. and the oldest city in the world, Varanasi is home to a man who transformed lives of people by surgery. Using tools and techniques available in that ancient time, he instituted a system of surgery and operation which at that time made him an outcast in society, but which left behind a legacy that is an important part of medical history today. This is the story of surgery, practiced by Sushruta – the father of modern medicine. His tools antechniques remain virtually unchanged 2600 years later. How did he become so skilled? The answers unfold in the Banaras Hindu University in Banaras, with a contemporary surgeon explaining Sushruta’s techniques.

Episode 2 

Bodhidharma

A 60-year-old Tamil monk, carrying nothing but his patra (bowl) arrives in China. He is an ill-tempered, profusely bearded and wide-eyed barbarian who trains the monks at Shaolin in a hand-to-hand combat form – which then becomes Shaolin Kung Fu. The practice of Zen and unarmed combat spreads all across the East – Japan, Thailand, Cambodia, and takes various forms - especially Chinese action flicks, where most heroes behave much like Bodhidharma – the Tamil Monk. Who was Bodhidharma? Where did he come from? Why did he go to China? Where did he learn to fight? From the traditional Silambam and Kalaripayuttu masters of South India to the Far East, this is a story that needs to be told.

Episode 3 

Board Games

The origin of three of the world's most loved and played games all over the world can be traced back to India. Modern chess developed out of this ancient Indian game - chaturaṅga – meaning four parts. Trace the history of Chess back to the Gupta Period in the 6th century AD. From the Indian game Pachisi, Ludo has become one of the most popular games in the world, played in all cultures and among all kinds of people. And Snakes and Ladders originated from the ancient Indian game of Mokshapattam, where the squares had morals attached to them. So what are the legends and stories associated with these games which are so much a part of our culture and tradition?

Episode 4 

Wootz Steel

326 B.C.E. In the epic battle between Alexander and Porus, Porus's much smaller force holds out against Alexander's massive army and creates a legend of courage equal to the Spartans. When Porus surrenders he hands Alexander a sword made of the finest steel known to man. This sword can slice cleanly through a falling handkerchief, is self-sharpening, and at the same time sharper and more bendable that any steel for the next 2000 years. Wootz steel (from the Tamil ukku/urukku) was used to make the legendary Damascus steel blades. These blades were more highly prized than wealth and gemstones across the world, and the steel was only manufactured in India. Yet, by the 18th century, the technique was lost for ever. This is the story of the greatest weapons ever made, one that held primacy over the world for close to 2000 years, was developed and manufactured in our land, but has been forgotten, and lost. Perhaps in some small Tamilian village, there is a blacksmith from out of time, still forging wootz steel unbeknownst to the world. Anything is possible in India.

Episode 5 

Tipu Sultan's Rockets

The first rockets to be used as weapons were fire arrows in China, then Korea, and then by the Mongols of Genghis Khan. However, the effect of fire arrows was more psychologically than physically destructive. However, in the mid-1700s, in the kingdom of Mysore, the valiant fighter and the Tiger of Mysore, Tipu Sultan along with his father Haidar Ali developed a new kind of weapon. Unlike earlier rockets they built theirs out of iron –making a hollow tube into which an explosive was placed. These new rockets were not only far more dangerous and could cause great damage to anything they struck, but also had an effective range of over 2 kilometres. Tipu Sultan used these effectively against the British forces, wreaking great havoc among the British armies, before he was ultimately defeated. However, those rockets of Tipu’s became the blueprint for the Congreve rocket, which the British used to defeat Napoleon, and were the forerunners of all rocket artillery. And today the rockets have not only taken the shape of missiles, they also are the technology behind satellites. Tipu's Rocket has come a long way!

Episode 6 

Lothal Dockyards

The world's oldest known dock is situated at the Indus Valley site of Lothal (2400 BCE). It was located away from the main current to avoid deposition of silt. Modern oceanographers have observed that the Harappans must have possessed great knowledge relating to tides in order to build such a dock on the ever-shifting course of the Sabarmati, as well as exemplary hydrography and maritime engineering. This was the earliest known dock found in the world, equipped to berth and service ships. It is speculated that Lothal engineers studied tidal movements, and their effects on brick-built structures, since the walls are of kiln-burnt bricks. Come explore the history of this dock with us, as we talk with archaeologists, oceanographers, maritime engineers and scientists, and travel down to Lothal to unravel the science and technology behind this marvel of engineering and try to gain some insight into the minds and culture of the Harappan people who created this marvel and then fell into obscurity.

Episode 7 

Flush Toilets

The Indus Valley civilisation, circa 3000 years ago, created the first integrated city toilet system know to man. And yes, the toilets flushed! How did they do it? To understand that, we visit Dholavira and discover that not only the sanitation and drainage systems, the city planning, the water storage and water management systems were more advanced than in some of the modern cities today. The IVC also gave us many other inventions that are in common use today – things such as buttons, bangles, rulers. The thing is – buttons for clothes, bangles and ornaments, and the flush toilet – are the things that define modern civilisation. Which brings us to the very interesting query – did The IVC actually invent modern civilisation, albeit in ancient times?

References

External links

2014 Indian television series debuts